Brooks's wolf gecko (Gekko brooksii) is a species of lizard in the family Gekkonidae. The species is endemic to Sumatra.

Etymology
The specific name, brooksii, is in honor of British metallurgical chemist Cecil Joslin Brooks, who collected natural history specimens in Borneo and Sumatra.

Habitat
The preferred natural habitat of G. brooksii is forest.

Behavior
G. brooksii is arboreal, living in the forest canopy.

Reproduction
G. brooksii is oviparous.

References

Further reading
Boulenger GA (1920). "Descriptions of a new Gecko and a new Snake from Sumatra". Annals and Magazine of Natural History, Ninth Series 5: 281–283. (Gecko brooksii, new species, pp. 281–282).
Russell AP (1979). "A New Species of Luperosaurus (Gekkonidae) with Comments on the Genus". Herpetologica 35 (3): 282–288. (Luperosaurus brooksii, new combination).

Gekko
Endemic fauna of Sumatra
Reptiles of Indonesia
Reptiles described in 1920
Taxa named by George Albert Boulenger